The Esbjerg Energy is a Danish professional ice hockey team based in Esbjerg, Denmark, playing in the Metal Ligaen, the top tier of Danish ice hockey. The club was founded in 2005 and play their home games in the Granly Hockey Arena which has a capacity of 4,200 spectators.

Until 2004 the team played under the name of E.I.K. (Esbjerg Ishockey Klub), but due to financial instability at the club, the professional license was transferred to Esbjerg fB. In early 2013 after spending eight seasons under the umbrella Esbjerg fB; the football club sold EfB Ishockey to businessman Christian Rølmer Christensen.

Club history

2013–present: Mark Pederson era

Season: 2013–2014

In the club's first season under new ownership, the club appointed Mark Pederson as the new head coach. The Canadian, a former NHL player and successful head coach in numerous ice hockey leagues, took over as the club's new coach. Out of the club's eight foreigners of the previous season, only one returned to the club, with the rest leaving to join new clubs. Among the foreigners who left to join new clubs, 3 out of the 8 were top 5 on the team, in points the previous season.

In Pederson's first season as the club's head coach, he led the team to the playoffs, though it was spoiled by a match fixing scandal. Three of the club's players including, Kirill Starkov, Tyler Mosienko and Dennis Jensen were suspended and fined after admitting to betting on their own team and match-fixing. After losing two key first liners due to suspension; Esbjerg was eliminated in the quarterfinal by local rivals SønderjyskE Ishockey.

Season: 2014–2015

In his second season as head coach, Pedersen added key players Andrew Clark, Mark Derlago and Scott Howe to the club, who together combined for 189 points over 101 games (76 goals and 113 assists). Pedersen managed to lead the club to the finals as they swept Odense, in the quarterfinals, and defeated Herning 4–2 in the semifinals on their way to the finals. Though the club was once again eliminated by SønderjyskE who defended their title for the third straight year.

Season: 2015–2016

For the 2015–16 season, Pedersen managed to keep several dominant core players. At the conclusion of the regular season, Esbjerg finished at a strong third place and were put up against seventh place Rødovre in the quarterfinals. Esbjerg defeated Rødovre in six games, three of which ended in overtime and advance to the semifinals.

In the semifinals, Esbjerg faced local rivals SønderjyskE, the three-time defending champions who had eliminated Esbjerg, in the previous two seasons. Esbjerg managed to win the series in seven games, the first time they had defeated SønderjyskE in a seven game-series since 2006. Esbjerg than went on to defeat Herning, 4–2 in a high scoring final, to win their first title since 2004.

Season: 2016–2017

For the time in Esbjerg icehockey history, The Esbjerg Energy represented Denmark in the Annual Champions League tournament. Esbjerg was placed in Group G with Helsinki and EV Zug, Esbjerg did not advance to the next round, finishing the tournament with a 1–1–2 record.

After their early start to the season with international hockey, Esbjerg Energy struggled in their home league. The first half of the season was spent in the bottom of the league. Second half of the season Esbjerg catapulted to the top of the league winning many games in a row. Esbjerg finished 4th and picked rivals SønderjyskE as their opponents for the quarterfinals. In the Semifinals Esbjerg Energy eliminated Frederikshavn Whitehawks in game seven and advanced to their third final in as many years. In the finals Esbjerg won the championship at home in game 5, making them back-to-back champions for the first time in club history.

Season by season record

Current roster
Updated February 20, 2019

|}

Retired Numbers
14 Oleg Starkov, F, 1991–2000
15 Soren Jensen, D, 1984–2006
16 Andreas Andreasen, D, 1994–2012

Team captains
 Olivier Coqueux, 2008–2009
 Andreas Andreasen, 2009–2010
 Kirill Starkov, 2010–2011
 Sune Hjulmand, 2011–2015
 Aaron Lee, 2015–2016
 Brock Nixon, 2016–

References

External links
Official site 

 
Ice hockey teams in Denmark
Ice hockey clubs established in 2005
2005 establishments in Denmark